Potamarius izabalensis is a species of catfish in the family Ariidae. It was described by Carl Leavitt Hubbs and Robert Rush Miller in 1960, originally under the genus Arius. It is known to inhabit Izabal Lake in Guatemala, and possibly also inhabits the Polochic River.

References

Ariidae
Taxa named by Carl Leavitt Hubbs
Taxa named by Robert Rush Miller
Fish described in 1960